Courtney Greene (born November 23, 1986) is a former American football safety. He was drafted by the Seattle Seahawks in the 2009 NFL Draft and played three seasons for the Jacksonville Jaguars. He played college football at Rutgers.

Early years
Greene starred at New Rochelle High School alongside future college teammates Ray Rice and Glenroy Lee. He led New Rochelle to the Class AA state championship in 2003, in which he earned MVP honors. Greene prepped during the 2004 season at Bridgton Academy.

College career
Joining his fellow New Rochelle alumni at Rutgers, Greene stepped into the starting lineup as a true freshman. He immediately established himself as a playmaker, leading the team in tackles with 116, en route to being named a Freshman All-American by Rivals, The Sporting News, College Football News, and the Football Writers Association of America. As a sophomore in 2006, Greene was named Second-team All-Big East, starting every game and helping to lead Rutgers to its best football season in three decades.

In 2007, Greene was named to the Preseason Watch List for the Nagurski Trophy, and was a consensus preseason First-team All-Big East selection. In 2008, he was named to the All-Big East first-team.

Professional career
Greene was drafted by the Seattle Seahawks in the seventh round of the 2009 NFL Draft. He played three seasons for the Jacksonville Jaguars from 2009 to 2011. He appeared in 30 games and had 90 tackles.

References

External links
 Rutgers Scarlet Knights bio

1986 births
Living people
Sportspeople from New Rochelle, New York
Players of American football from New York (state)
American football safeties
Rutgers Scarlet Knights football players
Seattle Seahawks players
Jacksonville Jaguars players
Bridgton Academy alumni
New Rochelle High School alumni